Gökköy railway station is a railway station near Gökköy, Turkey. The station is a part of the Gökköy Logistics Center. TCDD Taşımacılık operates three daily intercity trains from Eskişehir and Bandırma to İzmir.

Gökköy station was opened on 15 March 2015.

Gökköy Logistics Center
Gökköy Logistics Center is a freight railyard and one of 19 similar facilities that are in operation or under construction in Turkey. The facility consists of a railway station with one side platform servicing one track, a railcar maintenance facility, a yard for freight trains and an intermodel freight transferring yard.

History
Plans to build a new freight rail yard outside the city of Balıkesir were finalized in 2007. The Turkish State Railways and the Balıkesir Metropolitan Municipality agreed to construct a new  railyard near the village of Gökköy, inside the Balıkesir Industrial Park (Balıkesir OSB). In doing so, the existing freight yard next to Balıkesir station, in the city center, would be decommissioned and the property used solely for passenger trains. Construction of the facility began in 2012 and was expected to be complete by mid-2013. Opening of the facility was delayed by two until 15 March 2015, when Gökköy was officially opened by President Recep Tayyip Erdoğan in a ceremony at the facility.

References

External links
Gökköy Station timetable

Railway stations in Balıkesir Province
Railway stations opened in 2015
2015 establishments in Turkey